Jacques Wild (20 October 1905 – 26 November 1990) was a French footballer. He played in eight matches for the France national football team between 1927 and 1929.

References

External links
 

1905 births
1990 deaths
French footballers
France international footballers
Place of birth missing
Association football midfielders
Stade Français (association football) players
Olympic footballers of France
Footballers at the 1928 Summer Olympics